Crničani may refer to:
 Crničani, Dojran, North Macedonia
 Crničani, Mogila, North Macedonia